is a passenger railway station located in the town of Wake, Okayama Prefecture, Japan, operated by the West Japan Railway Company (JR West).

Lines

Station layout
The station consists of one side platform and one island platform connected by a footbridge. The station building is located on the side of Platform 1. The station is staffed.

Platforms

History
Wake Station was opened on 18 March 1891. With the privatization of Japanese National Railways (JNR) on 1 April 1987, the station came under the control of JR West.

Passenger statistics
In fiscal 2019, the station was used by an average of 1355 passengers daily

Surrounding area
Wake Town Hall
Okayama Prefectural Wake Shizutani High School

See also
List of railway stations in Japan

References

External links

 JR West Station Official Site

Railway stations in Okayama Prefecture
Sanyō Main Line
Railway stations in Japan opened in 1891